VampireFreaks.com is an online clothing store and former social networking site for goths and rivetheads. VampireFreaks was launched as a social networking site in 1999 and added an online clothing store in 2001. The social network element was removed in February 2020.

Online clothing store 
The VampireFreaks online clothing store has steadily grown since its inception in 2001, currently featuring thousands of products. It started as an offshoot of the popular VampireFreaks social networking site and is currently the primary focus of the VampireFreaks brand. Clothing styles featured include goth, punk rock, emo, metal, steampunk, kawaii, and rockabilly. VampireFreaks is an official distributor of brands such as Tripp NYC, Killstar, Kreepsville 666, Sourpuss, Dark In Love, Punk Rave, Demonia, Devil Fashion, and Alchemy. In addition to selling other brands, VampireFreaks sells its own custom-branded items such as t-shirts, hoodies, bracelets, leggings, messenger bags, and tote bags with original VampireFreaks artwork. Online store features include frequently updated sales, a 'wishlist', a 'top sellers' section, a clearance section, and a rewards program. The rewards program allows users to accrue points with each purchase to get future discounts and free items. Customers can also refer a friend to get additional rewards. VampireFreaks promotes its online store through its social media and its email newsletters.

Social networking site  
VampireFreaks was previously a social networking site, created by site owner Jet Berelson in 1999. It began with a small number of forums dedicated to goth and industrial music.
Over the years it grew to be a large social network, with thousands of members. Website features included user groups that were called 'cults' and allowed users to create their communities (forums) within the website.  The website also had event pages, music interviews, models, and frequent design contests.  It also featured a popular message board which is a major component of the site's success. The site’s main topic of focus, aside from socializing, was the music content users create. Jet regularly updated the site with information concerning not only bands but various alternative events. Many people have found love on the site, and this has been focused on during Valentine's Day when couples that met through the site submitted stories of how they met their matches. "Premium Memberships" were also offered (for a fee), with features such as the ability to upload more pictures, see who views the user's profile, and "powerbomb" the "unwanted" VF members. On 17 June 2019, Jet announced that he would shut down the website in February 2020, wanting to focus more on the VampireFreaks online store, real life, and Dark Side of the Con, an alternative gathering organized by the company. It was shut down on 1 February 2020.

Physical clothing store 

VampireFreaks had a clothing store, named after the site, located in New York City. The store sold similar products to the current website and was also a social gathering place. The store hosted meet-and-greets for popular electronic and industrial bands including The Birthday Massacre, Aesthetic Perfection, and Faderhead. It closed in 2011 after over three years of operation.

Events 
VampireFreaks hosts a wide number of events, mainly in the New York City area.  Some of the most popular of these events include 'Cybertron', a goth/industrial club night in NYC, 'The Black Parade', an emo-pop-punk club night in Brooklyn, and the 'Triton Festival', a music festival that has attracted goth and industrial bands from around the world.  VampireFreaks' event 'Dark Side Of The Con', was a 3-day dark alternative convention held in New Jersey.  Dark Side of the Con has rapidly grown since 2017, attracting attendees from around the world, and is advertised as North America's largest goth convention/festival. Dark Side of the Con 4 in March 2020 was forced to reschedule multiple times due to quarantine from coronavirus in the Tri-state area and was held in March of 2022 to record numbers and was featured in Fox News. 
In 2022 VampireFreaks announced their next 3-Day festival 'Dark Force Fest' which is being held at the same venue as 'Dark Side of the Con', the Sheraton in Parsippany, NJ.

Controversies 
The now-defunct VampireFreaks Social Network, much like other social network sites Myspace and Facebook, has been potentially linked to several crimes:

 Kimveer Gill, the perpetrator of the Dawson College Shooting, maintained an account on the website. 
 A triple homicide in Medicine Hat, Alberta, Canada. In 2005, a 12-year-old girl and her 23-year-old predator, whom she communicated with on VampireFreaks.com, were charged in the murders.
 Two Toronto men were charged with carrying out the bidding of a woman they met on the site by stabbing a 12-year-old boy 73 times, killing him, and drinking his blood 
 In Australia, in 2007, a 47-year-old man and his 17-year-old son from Victoria were accused of using VampireFreaks.com to create fictitious characters to prey on young girls. On January 21, 2010, the man  was found guilty of the murder of Carly Ryan, a schoolgirl he had groomed via MySpace.
 In December 2007, in California, a 13-year-old girl posing as an adult met with a 23-year-old man on VampireFreaks.com. When it was found out they met in real life, he was arrested and found with photos of them kissing. The jury had reasonable doubt, however, and the man was found not guilty on two of the charges.

Jet has responded to some of this controversy, saying that the website does not influence its users to commit crimes and that "The goth scene is a very friendly, nurturing, non-violent community and we are very supportive of our users and do not condone any illegal activities".

References

External links 
 

Blog hosting services
American social networking websites
Internet properties established in 1999
Goth subculture
1999 establishments in the United States